Scouting and Guiding on Mayotte is served by:
 Scouts de la collectivité départemental française de Mayotte (until 2004: Scouts français de la collectivité départemental de Mayotte), which is affiliated to the Fédération du scoutisme français
 Scouts à Mayotte

Mayotte
Mayotte
Mahoran culture
Mayotte